Tito Nordio (17 March 1908 – 13 October 1959) was a sailor from Italy who represented his country at the 1928 Summer Olympics in Amsterdam, Netherlands.

References 

1908 births
1959 deaths
Sailors at the 1928 Summer Olympics – 12' Dinghy
Olympic sailors of Italy
Italian male sailors (sport)